Eupithecia casta is a moth in the  family Geometridae. It is found in Peru.

References

Moths described in 1904
casta
Moths of South America